Jayshree Talpade is an Indian actress and dancer who mostly plays in Bollywood films.

Career
Talpade began her career with Goonj Uthi Shehnai. She gained popularity when she started performing item dances in films, being an exponent of Kathak. However she had already gained a foothold in the industry, as a child artiste in Sangeet Samrat Tansen, Zameen Ke Taare (1960) and Pyar Ki Pyaas (1961). According to her, it was Gopi Kishan who spotted her dancing in a film. Initially, she wanted to become a doctor, but fate intervened when film director Amit Bose cast her in a dance sequence for Abhilasha in 1968, after being recommended by choreographer Harmendar. After that, she danced in more than 500 movies in the 1970s and 1980s. She has done vampish-comedy and sympathetic roles. Jayshree has acted in various Indian languages including Bengali, Tamil, Telugu, Malayalam, Kannada, Marwadi, Rajastani, English, Sindhi, Assamese, Bhojpuri, Oriya, Haryani, Garyali, Nepali, Punjabi, Marathi and Gujarati.

She has performed on stage all over the world with stars such as Mohammad Rafi, Manna Dey, Mukesh and Asha Bhosle. She has received 2 Maharashtra State Government awards for Marathi film as a leading lady, 3 Gujarat state government awards, Hyderabad Award, 6 lions club awards from Delhi and Mumbai. She received the Life Time Achievement Award for Bhojpuri films and Gujarati films.

Citing an incident which took place in a remote place of Gwalior, while shooting for a song, in an interview in 2012, Jayshree is quoted to have said: "We were shooting at a remote spot in Gwalior, for Kasam Bhavani Ki (1981), in which Yogeeta Bali played the female lead. At the shooting site, I noticed a lot of police personnel. Some of the officers came up to me and said it was better I didn't shoot and returned to Bombay. "But why?" I exclaimed. "Madame", they replied, "we have received information that the dacoits in this region, are planning to kidnap you. They appear to be quite crazy about you". I was shocked! Such pretty girls like Yogeeta and Nazneen around, and I was their target!" The song was then shot at Film City. "Meri Lal Gulabi Choli" (Kasam Bhawani Ki), was the song.

Personal life
Jayshree got married in 1989 to film director Jayprakash Karnataki (son of former actor & director Master Vinayak and the brother of renowned film actress Nanda) and she gave birth to a son, Swastik J. Karnataki in 1991. Her sister Meena T. is also an actress and dancer. Her nephew is the Bollywood actor Shreyas Talpade

Filmography

Television

References

External links
 
 

Living people
Year of birth missing (living people)
Actresses in Hindi cinema
Actresses in Marathi cinema
Actresses in Malayalam cinema
Indian film actresses
Actresses in Gujarati cinema
Indian soap opera actresses
Indian television actresses
20th-century Indian actresses
Place of birth missing (living people)
20th-century Indian dancers
Actresses in Hindi television
21st-century Indian actresses